Real Love is a 2018 Franco-Belgian comedy-drama film written and directed by Claire Burger. It stars Bouli Lanners as Mario Messina and Justine Lacroix and Sarah Henochsberg as her daughters, Frida and Nick.

The film had its world premiere at the 75th Venice International Film Festival, where it competed for the Queer Lion. At the 10th Magritte Awards, Real Love won in the category of Best Actor for Bouli Lanners.

Accolades

References

External links
 

2018 films
2018 comedy-drama films
Belgian comedy-drama films
Belgian LGBT-related films
French comedy-drama films
French LGBT-related films
2010s French-language films
2018 LGBT-related films
LGBT-related comedy-drama films
French-language Belgian films
2010s French films